Viva Bianca (born Viva Skubiszewski; 17 November 1983,) is an Australian actress best known for her role as Ilithyia on the Starz network series Spartacus: Blood and Sand and Spartacus: Vengeance.

Bianca graduated from the Western Australian Academy of Performing Arts where she received a best actress award. She is the daughter of Cezary Skubiszewski, a Polish Australian composer for film, television and orchestra. Bianca cites Cate Blanchett and Heath Ledger as Australian actors who have influenced her.

Career
Bianca has appeared in many Australian TV Series such as Eugenie Sandler P.I., Marshall Law, All Saints and The Strip. She has also appeared in the Australian films Accidents Happen and Bad Bush.

Bianca starred as Ilithyia, the daughter of senator Albinius and wife of Glaber, in the Starz originals series Spartacus: Blood and Sand and Spartacus: Vengeance. She starred opposite Kirk Barker in A Prince for Christmas (2015).

Filmography

References

External links

Australian people of Czech descent
1983 births
Living people
Australian television actresses
Australian film actresses
Australian people of Polish descent
21st-century Australian actresses
Actresses from Melbourne
Western Australian Academy of Performing Arts alumni
Category:Australian people of Polish descent